Presidential elections were held in Ecuador in 1911. The result was a victory for Emilio Estrada Carmona, who received 94% of the vote.

Results

References

Presidential elections in Ecuador
Ecuador
1911 in Ecuador
Election and referendum articles with incomplete results